The 2018 Tour of Guangxi was a road cycling stage race that took place between 16 and 21 October 2018 in China. It was the 2nd edition of the Tour of Guangxi and the thirty-seventh event of the 2018 UCI World Tour.

Teams
Eighteen teams of up to seven riders started the race:

Route

General classification

References

2018 UCI World Tour
2018 in Chinese sport
2018
October 2018 sports events in China